Sorbitan is a mixture of isomeric organic compounds derived from the dehydration of sorbitol and is an intermediate in the conversion of sorbitol to isosorbide. Sorbitan is primarily used in the production of surfactants such as polysorbates; which are important emulsifying agents, with a total annual demand of more than 10000 tons in 2012.

Synthesis
Sorbitan is produced by the dehydration of sorbitol and is an intermediate in the conversion of sorbitol to isosorbide. The dehydration reaction usually produces sorbitan as a mixture of five- and six-membered cyclic ethers (1,4-anhydrosorbitol,  1,5-anhydrosorbitol and 1,4,3,6-dianhydrosorbitol) with the five-membered 1,4-anhydrosorbitol form being the dominate product.  The rate of formation of sorbitan is typically greater than that of isosorbide, which allows it to be produced selectively, providing the reaction conditions are carefully controlled. The dehydration reaction has been shown to work even in the presence of excess water.

Surfactant derivatives

Esters
Sorbitan esters (also known as Spans) are nonionic surfactants that are used as emulsifying agents in the preparation of emulsions, creams, and ointments for pharmaceutical and cosmetic use. When used alone they produce stable water-in-oil emulsions but they are frequently used with a polysorbate in varying proportions to produce water-in-oil or oil-in-water emulsions or creams with a variety of different textures and consistencies. Sorbitan esters are also used as emulsifiers and stabilisers in food.

Polysorbate

Ethoxylated sorbitan esters are known as polysorbates (trade name: Tweens). They are an important class of emulsifiers used in a variety of settings, including pharmaceuticals and food.

References

Tetrahydrofurans
Non-ionic surfactants
Monosaccharide derivatives